Simone Rosalba (born January 31, 1976 in Paola, Calabria) is a volleyball player from Italy, who won the bronze medal with the men's national team at the 2000 Summer Olympics. Playing as an outside-hitter, he claimed his first medal (bronze) for the Azzurri in 1997 at the European Championship in The Netherlands.

References

External links
 FIVB Profile

1976 births
Living people
People from Paola, Calabria
Italian men's volleyball players
Olympic bronze medalists for Italy
Volleyball players at the 2000 Summer Olympics
Olympic medalists in volleyball
Medalists at the 2000 Summer Olympics
Sportspeople from the Province of Cosenza